The 2015 FIFA U-20 World Cup was the twentieth edition of the FIFA U-20 World Cup since its inception in 1977 as the FIFA World Youth Championship. The competition took place for the first time in New Zealand, the third time on Oceanian soil after Australia staged the 1981 and 1993 editions. A total of 52 matches were played in seven host cities.

During the first meeting of the local organising committee in January 2013, provisional dates of 19 June to 11 July were given towards hosting of games, with a final decision on stadiums and cities originally meant to be taken in February 2013. Two more postponements then followed.

France, the 2013 champions, were unable to defend their title as they failed to reach the final round of the UEFA qualifying tournament. In doing so, they became the fourth consecutive incumbent title holder to fail to qualify for the subsequent tournament.

Serbia won the final against Brazil 2–1, becoming the first team representing the country to win a FIFA competition title since their independence from Yugoslavia and the dissolution of Serbia and Montenegro. Yugoslavia previously won the 1987 FIFA World Youth Championship.

Host selection
Four FIFA member associations officially submitted their bids to host the 2015 FIFA U-20 World Cup by the deadline of 11 February 2011. On 3 March 2011, FIFA announced that the tournament would be held for the first time in New Zealand. This is the third FIFA competition staged in this country, after the 1999 FIFA U-17 World Championship and the 2008 FIFA U-17 Women's World Cup.

Bidding member associations
  New Zealand
  Peru
  Tunisia
  Wales

Venues
Auckland, Christchurch, Dunedin, Hamilton, New Plymouth, Wellington and Whangarei were the 7 cities chosen to host the competition.

Before the stadium announcements were made, Dunedin City council suggested in January 2013, that it would not bid to host matches at Forsyth Barr Stadium (also known as Otago Stadium) unless the costs (an estimated $1m) could be lowered. The stadium hosted seven matches there, the last of which being a Round of 16 game.

Qualified teams
In addition to host nation New Zealand, 23 nations qualified from six separate continental competitions.

 1.  Teams that made their debut.
 2.  Serbia made their first U-20 World Cup appearance as an independent nation. They were chosen as the descendant of the now-defunct Yugoslavia, which qualified in 1979 and 1987.

Draw and schedule
The final draw was held on 10 February 2015, 17:30 local time, at the SkyCity Grand, Auckland. For the draw, the 24 teams were divided into four seeding pots:
Pot 1: Hosts and continental champions of five confederations (except OFC)
Pot 2: Remaining teams from AFC and CAF
Pot 3: Remaining teams from CONCACAF and CONMEBOL
Pot 4: Remaining teams from OFC and UEFA

As a basic principle, teams from the same confederation could not be drawn against each other at the group stage. As the CAF U-20 Championship was not completed at the time of the draw, a separate draw took place on 23 March 2015 in Dakar, Senegal, at the tournament's conclusion to determine the groups where the 2nd, 3rd and 4th placed CAF teams would play in, to ensure there was no manipulation of games in the qualifying tournament ensuring fairness to all qualified teams.

The schedule of the tournament was unveiled on 20 November 2013.

Match officials
A total of 21 referees, 6 support referees, and 42 assistant referees were selected for the tournament.

Squads

The 24 squads were officially announced by FIFA on 21 May 2015. Each participating national association had to submit a final list of 21 players (three of whom must be goalkeepers) at least 10 days before the tournament started. These players were shortlisted from a provisional list of 35 players, including a minimum of four goalkeepers. All players must have been born on or after 1 January 1995. If a player listed in the final squad suffered a serious injury up until 24 hours before the kick-off of his team's first match, he could be replaced by a player from the provisional list with the approval of FIFA's medical and organising committees.

In July 2015, it was reported that the New Zealand squad had included an ineligible player, South African Deklan Wynne not having completed the requisite period of residence in New Zealand.

Group stage

The winners and runners-up of each group and the best four third-placed teams advanced to the round of 16. The rankings of teams in each group were determined as follows:

If two or more teams were equal on the basis of the above three criteria, their rankings were determined as follows:

All times are local, New Zealand Standard Time (UTC+12).

Group A

Group B

Group C

Group D

Group E

Group F

Ranking of third-placed teams
The four best ranked third-placed teams also advanced to the round of 16. They were paired with the winners of groups A, B, C and D, according to a table published in Section 18 of the tournament regulations.

Knockout stage
In the knockout stage, if a match was level at the end of regular time (two periods of 45 minutes), extra time was played (two periods of 15 minutes) and followed, if necessary, by a penalty shoot-out to determine the winner. In the case of the third place match, as it was played just before the final, extra time was skipped and a penalty shoot-out took place if necessary.

Combinations of matches in the Round of 16
The third-placed teams which advanced to the round of 16 were placed with the winners of groups A, B, C and D according to a table published in Section 18 of the tournament regulations.

Round of 16

Quarter-finals

Semi-finals

Third place match

Final

Awards
The following awards were given at the conclusion of the tournament. They were all sponsored by Adidas, except for the FIFA Fair Play Award.

Goalscorers
With five goals, Viktor Kovalenko and Bence Mervó are the top scorers in the tournament. In total, 154 goals were scored by 100 different players, with six of them credited as own goals.

5 goals

 Viktor Kovalenko
 Bence Mervó

4 goals

 Hany Mukhtar
 Marc Stendera
 Adama Traoré
 André Silva

3 goals

 Niklas Stark
 Dostonbek Khamdamov

2 goals

 Ángel Correa
 Andreas Pereira
 Gabriel Boschilia
 Judivan
 Marcos Guilherme
 Iosefo Verevou
 Julian Brandt
 Grischa Prömel
 Yaw Yeboah
 Bryan Róchez
 Dieudonne Gbakle
 Diadie Samassékou
 Taiwo Awoniyi
 Godwin Saviour
 Isaac Success
 Fidel Escobar
 Ivo Rodrigues
 Nuno Santos
 Gelson Martins
 Mamadou Thiam
 Nemanja Maksimović
 Staniša Mandić
 Ivan Šaponjić
 Andrija Živković
 Artem Besyedin
 Emerson Hyndman
 Rubio Rubin
 Eldor Shomurodov
 Zabikhillo Urinboev

1 goal

 Emiliano Buendía
 Giovanni Simeone
 Valentin Grubeck
 Bernd Gschweidl
 Danilo
 Gabriel Jesus
 Jean Carlos
 Jorge
 Léo Pereira
 Rafael Santos Borré
 Joao Rodríguez
 Alexis Zapata
 Saula Waqa
 Kevin Akpoguma
 Levin Öztunalı
 Marvin Stefaniak
 Clifford Aboagye
 Emmanuel Boateng
 Benjamin Tetteh
 Kevin Álvarez
 Jhow Benavidez
 Dávid Forgács
 Zsolt Kalmár
 Souleymane Coulibaly
 Aboubacar Doumbia
 Youssouf Koné
 Kevin Gutiérrez
 Hirving Lozano
 Yan Naing Oo
 Aung Thu
 Noah Billingsley
 Sam Brotherton
 Stuart Holthusen
 Clayton Lewis
 Monty Patterson
 Joel Stevens
 Kingsley Sokari
 Musa Yahaya
 Choe Ju-song
 Jhamal Rodríguez
 Raphael Guzzo
 João Vigário
 Akram Afif
 Moussa Koné
 Sidy Sarr
 Ibrahima Wadji
 Sergej Milinković-Savić
 Valeriy Luchkevych
 Eduard Sobol
 Roman Yaremchuk
 Paul Arriola
 Bradford Jamieson IV
 Maki Tall
 Franco Acosta
 Gastón Pereiro
 Mathías Suárez
 Mirjamol Kosimov

1 own goal

 Marvin Schwäbe (playing against Honduras)
 Kevin Álvarez (playing against Fiji)
 Attila Talabér (playing against Serbia)
 Min Hyo-song (playing against Brazil)
 Chin Hormechea (playing against Austria)
 Andelinou Correa (playing against Brazil)

Final ranking
As per statistical convention in football, matches decided in extra time are counted as wins and losses, while matches decided by penalty shoot-outs are counted as draws.

Organization

Emblem and mascot
The official emblem of the tournament was unveiled on 20 November 2013. The official mascot, a black sheep named Wooliam, was unveiled on 30 November 2014.

Ticketing
Prior to being released for 'General sale' on 13 June 2014, registered footballers in New Zealand were given 'priority treatment' by allowing them the option to buy tickets from two months earlier.

In the first three months of tickets going on sale to residents, an estimated 25,000 were sold.

See also
2015 Under-20 Five Nations Series - preparatory tournament for the U-20 World Cup

References

External links

FIFA U-20 World Cup New Zealand 2015, FIFA.com
Official 2015 U20 Ticketing website
2015 FIFA U20 World Cup New Zealand Dedicated site
2015 U20 World Cup Facebook page
FIFA Technical Report

 
2015
2015 Fifa U-20 World Cup
2014–15 in New Zealand association football
May 2015 sports events in New Zealand
June 2015 sports events in New Zealand
2015 in youth association football